Claudia Rueda is a Colombian picture book author and illustrator and the 2016 Hans Christian Andersen award nominee. She is the illustrator of The New York Times Best Seller Here Comes The Easter Cat and the author of the Oppenheim Platinum Award My Little Polar Bear among others. Her picture books have been published throughout North America, Europe and Asia and have been translated into more than ten different languages.

Published books
As writer and illustrator:
"Bunny Slopes" (Chronicle Books, 2016)
"Is it big or is it little?" (Eerdmans Books for Young Readers, 2013)
"Huff & Puff" (Abrams, 2012)
"No" (Groundwood, 2010),
"My Little Polar Bear" (Scholastic, 2009),
"Let's Play in the Forest" (Scholastic, 2006),

As Illustrator:
Here Comes Teacher Cat (Dial Penguin, 2017) 
Here Comes Valentine Cat (Dial Penguin, 2015) 
Here Comes the Tooth Fairy  Cat (Dial Penguin, 2015) 
Here Comes The Easter Cat (Dial Penguin, 2014) 
Here Comes Santa Cat (Dial Penguin, 2014) 
"Nacho and Lolita" (Scholastic, 2005)

Awards
2011 CCBC choice (Univ. Wisconsin),
2009 Oppenheim Platinum Award,
2007 National Parenting Publications Gold Award,
2006 CHILD Magazine Best Children’s Books,
Colombian IBBY Honor List

Biographical and critical sources
Periodicals
 Booklist, October 1, 2005, Jennifer Mattson
 Review of Nacho and Lolita, p. 66; November 15, 2006, Hazel Rochman
 Review of Let’s Play in the Forest While the Wolf Is Not Around, p. 51.
 Críticas, November 1, 2003, Ann Welton
 Review of Mientras se enfría el pastel; October 1, 2006, Veronica Covington,
 Kirkus Reviews, October 1, 2005, review of Nacho and Lolita, p. 1088; October 1, 2006
 Review of Let’s Play in the Forest While the Wolf Is Not Around, p. 1023.
 Publishers Weekly, August 22, 2005, review of Nacho and Lolita, p. 63.
 School Library Journal, October 2005, Rosalyn Pierini, review of Nacho and Lolita, p. 144; October 2006, Linda *Zeilstra Sawyer, review of Let’s Play in the Forest While the Wolf Is Not Around, p. 1125.

Interviews
Taller Espantapajaros. 

Online
Claudia Rueda Home Page,  (October 17, 2007).*
Open Library. 
Biblioteca Luis Angel Arango

References

 http://www.faqs.org/periodicals/201011/2184647921.html
 http://www.lesley.edu/gsass/creative_writing/student_chronicles.html

Year of birth missing (living people)
Living people
21st-century Colombian women artists
Colombian women writers
Colombian women children's writers
Colombian children's book illustrators
People from Bogotá
Colombian women illustrators